Leul or Leoul may refer to:

Aristocratic and court titles 
 Le'ul or Leoul, an Ethiopian title meaning "prince"

People 
 Leul Abate, Ethiopian pilot

Places 
 Guenete Leul Palace ("Paradise of Princes"), a royal palace in Addis Ababa, Ethiopia
 Monument to the Heroes of the Engineer Arm – often called Leul ("the Lion"), a monument in Bucharest, Romania